The 2001 NCAA Division I baseball season, play of college baseball in the United States organized by the National Collegiate Athletic Association (NCAA) began in the spring of 2001.  The season progressed through the regular season and concluded with the 2001 College World Series.  The College World Series, held for the fifty fifth time in 2001, consisted of one team from each of eight super regional competitions and was held in Omaha, Nebraska, at Johnny Rosenblatt Stadium as a double-elimination tournament.  Miami (FL) claimed the championship for the fourth time.

Conference winners
This is a partial list of conference champions from the 2001 season.  The NCAA sponsored regional and super regional competitions to determine the College World Series participants.  Each of the sixteen regionals consisted of four teams competing in double-elimination tournaments, with the winners advancing to eight best of three Super Regionals.  The winners of each Super Regional advanced to Omaha.  30 teams earned automatic bids by winning their conference championship while 34 teams earned at-large selections.

Conference standings
The following is an incomplete list of conference standings:

College World Series

The 2001 season marked the fifty fifth NCAA Baseball Tournament, which culminated with the eight team College World Series.  The College World Series was held in Omaha, Nebraska.  The eight teams played a double-elimination format, with Miami (FL) claiming their fourth championship with a 12–1 win over Stanford in the final.

Bracket

Award winners

All-America team

References